Mount Keith Station is a pastoral lease in Western Australia.

The station is named after nearby Mount Keith, which was named after Algernon Keith-Falconer, 9th Earl of Kintore by the explorer David Lindsay during the 1891 Elder expedition though the area. Mining leases became available in the area in 1895 following an expansion in the Murchison goldfields.

The  property stocked with 4,400 sheep was sold by Robert Oldham in 1950 to John Jones of Boogardie Station.

See also
List of ranches and stations
List of pastoral leases in Western Australia

References

Mid West (Western Australia)
Pastoral leases in Western Australia
Stations (Australian agriculture)